Thomas Cushman, an American sociologist, is Deffenbaugh de Hoyos Carlson Professor in the Social Sciences and Professor of Sociology at Wellesley College.

Cushman is editor of The Routledge Handbook of Human Rights (2011) and founder and editor-at-large of the Journal of Human Rights. He is a member of the editorial board of the Journal of Controversial Ideas.

Bibliography
 Notes from Underground: Rock Music Counterculture in Russia  (A Choice Outstanding Academic Book, 1995)
 George Orwell: Into the 21st Century, with John Rodden (Paradigm, 2005)
  A Matter of Principle: Humanitarian Arguments for War in Iraq, editor (University of California Press, 2005)
  Terror, Iraq and the Left: Christopher Hitchens and His Critics, with Simon Cottee (New York University Press, 2008)
 The Religious in Responses to Mass Atrocity, edited with Thomas Brudholm (Cambridge University Press, 2009).

References

Year of birth missing (living people)
Living people
American sociologists
Wellesley College faculty